The 22nd Pennsylvania Volunteer Cavalry was a cavalry regiment of the Union Army during the American Civil War.

History
The regiment was formed in February 1864, at Chambersburg, Pennsylvania, by the consolidation of two battalions, the Ringgold Cavalry and a battalion raised during the Gettysburg Campaign. The seven companies were mostly raised in Washington County. Jacob C. Higgins was selected to serve as colonel, A. J. Greenfield as lieutenant colonel, and George T. Work, Elias S. Troxell, and Henry A. Myers as majors.

The 22nd Pennsylvania Cavalry was sent to Maryland for training, after which it was assigned to the Department of West Virginia. The dismounted men were assigned to the Reserve Division, while the mounted portion of the unit became part of the 2nd Brigade, First Cavalry Division.

A detachment of the regiment, under the command of Major George T. Work, fought in the Battle of Moorefield on August 7, 1864. The regiment fought in several skirmishes during the Lynchburg Campaign and Early's Raid on Washington. In August, it was assigned to the Army of the Shenandoah as part of the 3rd Brigade, Cavalry Corps. It fought in several battles of Sheridan's campaign, such as at the Battle of Opequon and the Battle of Cedar Creek. In December, it was sent back to the Department of West Virginia, where it spent the remainder of the war chasing down guerrillas.

On June 24, 1865, it was consolidated with the 18th Pennsylvania Cavalry to form the 3rd Pennsylvania Provisional Cavalry.

Casualties
 Killed and mortally wounded: 0 officers, 33 enlisted men
 Wounded: ? officers, ? enlisted men
 Captured or missing: ? officers, ? enlisted men
 Died of disease: 1 officer, 96 enlisted men
 Total: ? officers, ? enlisted men

See also
List of Pennsylvania Civil War units

References

External links
 

Units and formations of the Union Army from Pennsylvania
History of Washington County, Pennsylvania
1864 establishments in Pennsylvania
Military units and formations established in 1864
Military units and formations disestablished in 1865